Hydroxyisobutyric acid may refer to:

 2-Hydroxyisobutyric acid
 3-Hydroxyisobutyric acid